Udo Springsklee (20 May 1939 – 17 September 1999) was a German sailor. He competed in the Star event at the 1968 Summer Olympics.

References

External links
 

1939 births
1999 deaths
German male sailors (sport)
Olympic sailors of East Germany
Sailors at the 1968 Summer Olympics – Star
Sportspeople from Dresden